A by-election was held for the Australian House of Representatives seat of Parramatta on 8 March 1958. This was triggered by the resignation of Liberal MP and Supply and Defence Production Minister Howard Beale to become Australian Ambassador to the United States.

The by-election was won by Liberal candidate Sir Garfield Barwick.

Results

References

1958 elections in Australia
New South Wales federal by-elections